Michael Jonathan Moore (born September 12, 1968) is an American attorney and former politician from Georgia. Moore is a former Georgia state senator and United States Attorney for the Middle District of Georgia.

Early life 
On September 12, 1968, Moore was born in Atlanta, Georgia.

Education 
In 1989, Moore earned a Bachelor of Arts degree from Mercer University. In 1993, Moore earned a JD degree in law from Mercer University School of Law.

Career 
On January 31, 2002 Moore was sworn in as a member of Georgia Senate. Moore served as a member of Georgia Senate until January 2003.

Moore is a former attorney who served as the United States Attorney for the Middle District of Georgia from 2010 to 2015.

Personal life 
Moore's wife is Debbie Moore. They have two children. They live in Perry, Georgia.

References

External links 
 Michael Moore at ballotpedia.org

Living people
Democratic Party Georgia (U.S. state) state senators
United States Attorneys for the Middle District of Georgia
1968 births